Anatoliy Hlibovych Zahorodniy (born 29 January 1951) is a Ukrainian theoretical physicist and an organizer of science; an academician of NANU (since 2006), Vice President (2011-2020) and President of the National Academy of Sciences of Ukraine  (since October 2020). Director of Nikolay Bogolyubov Intitute of Theoretical Physics of the NAS of Ukraine (since 2002). 
Doctor of Physical and Mathematical Sciences (1990), Professor (1998), Laureate of the State Prize of Ukraine in Science and Technology (2005), Honored Worker of Science and Technology of Ukraine (2012). He has been a Member of the National Security and Defense Council of Ukraine (since January 20, 2021).

Biography

He was born on January 29, 1951, in the village of Velyka Bahachka, the administrative center of Velyka Bahachka Raion of Poltava region, Ukraine.

In 1972 he  graduated from the Faculty of Radiophysics, Kharkiv State University  (now - V.N. Karazin Kharkiv National University). In 1978 he defended his Candidate of Sciences dissertation  "Fluctuations and emission spectra of bounded plasma" and received the degree of Candidate of Physical and Mathematical Sciences in "Theoretical Physics".In 1990 he  defended his dissertation (Dr. of Sci. degree) on "Electromagnetic fluctuations in limited plasma-molecular systems" and received a doctorate in Physics and Mathematics in "Plasma Physics".

From 1972 on, he has been at the Nikolay Bogolyubov Institute of Theoretical Physics of the NAS of Ukraine. From 1980 to 1988 he was scientific secretary. From 1989 to 2002, he was deputy director for research. From 1996 to 2016, he was head of the Department of Theory and Modeling of Plasma Processes.  From 2003, he has been the director.

In 1997 he was elected a Corresponding member of the National Academy of Sciences of Ukraine,  in the section "Theoretical Physics, Plasma Physics"; in 1998 he was awarded the Academic title of Professor. In 2006 he was elected an Academician of the National Academy of Sciences of Ukraine. From 2009 to 2011 he was its Chief Scientific Secretary; from 2011 to 2020, Vice President, and from 2020 on  he has been President of the National Academy of Sciences of Ukraine.

Scientific contribution

His scientific works are devoted to the problems of theoretical and mathematical physics, plasma theory, statistical physics, physics of kinetic phenomena.

Together with Ivan Yakymenko and Yuriy Klymontovych he developed a statistical theory of spatially bounded plasma-molecular systems, on the basis of which he investigated the influence of the interaction of plasma and molecular subsystems on electromagnetic fluctuations in such systems. He obtained new kinetic equations for the distribution functions of free and bound charged particles in bounded plasma-molecular media, established the explicit form of collision integrals, and investigated the influence of boundary surfaces on the distributions of electrons, ions, and molecules near the medium boundary. He developed the theory of bremsstrahlung in plasma-molecular systems, which takes into account all possible scattering processes involving charged particles and molecules, as well as the scattering of electrons and molecules by collective fluctuations.

In the 1980s and 1990s, together with Oleksiy Sytenko, he generalized the theory of fluctuations in a stable stationary plasma to the case of turbulent plasma with diffusion-drift motions of the liquid type. Calculated the dynamic form factors of such a plasma, investigated their features associated with large-scale turbulent motions in such a plasma. Within the developed approach, he proposed a model of non-Markov diffusion of particles in turbulent plasma.

Further research was aimed at the kinetic description of dusty plasma and the development of the theory of electromagnetic fluctuations in such plasma, taking into account the self-consistent formation of the dynamic charge of powders. 

He developed the kinetic theory of dusty plasma. On the basis of the first principles of statistical mechanics, he derived microscopic equations and a chain of Bogolyubov equations for dusty plasma, which made it possible to explain a wide class of new physical phenomena. In particular, he proposed a kinetic approach to the calculation of the effective interaction potentials of powders in plasma and applied it to the study of shielded potentials in weakly ionized plasma, including in the presence of external fields. He found that charging the powders with plasma currents [absent in the source] leads to their decryption, i.e. to the appearance of the Coulomb asymptotics of the effective potential. It has also been shown that the specific polarization of the plasma near the moving powder can lead to a significant reduction in the coefficient of friction and even a change in its sign (negative friction).

He developed the theory of electromagnetic fluctuations in powdered weakly ionized plasma, taking into account the dynamic charging of powders with plasma currents. Proposed general relations for the dielectric response function of dusty plasma and fluctuation currents.

References 

1951 births
Living people
People from Poltava Oblast
21st-century Ukrainian physicists
National University of Kharkiv alumni
Presidents of the National Academy of Sciences of Ukraine
Laureates of the State Prize of Ukraine in Science and Technology
Laureates of the Honorary Diploma of the Verkhovna Rada of Ukraine